Ralph Francis Howard, 7th Earl of Wicklow (24 December 1877 – 11 October 1946) was an Irish aristocrat and politician.

Biography
Howard was the son of Cecil Howard, 6th Earl of Wicklow and Francesca Maria Chamberlayne. He succeeded as Earl of Wicklow on the death of his father in 1891.

Lord Wicklow was commissioned a second-lieutenant in the 2nd Life Guards on 16 February 1898, promoted to lieutenant on 26 April 1899, and saw active service in South Africa from 1899 to 1900 during the Second Boer War. A squadron from the 2nd Life Guards was attached to the Household Cavalry Regiment during the war, and Lord Wicklow served as Brigade Signalling Officer, and received the Queen's South Africa Medal with three clasps. After his return to the United Kingdom, he was promoted to captain on 3 September 1902.

In 1922, he was nominated by W. T. Cosgrave to the Seanad Éireann of the Irish Free State on its formation. He served for six years until he was defeated at the 1928 Seanad election.

Family
Lord Wicklow married at St. Mark's Church, North Audley Street, London, on 14 January 1902, Lady Gladys Mary Hamilton (1880–1917), daughter of James Hamilton, 2nd Duke of Abercorn and Lady Mary Anna Curzon-Howe. As the couple were both prominent and visible members of Anglo-Irish society, the bride received valuable presents from several public bodies in Ireland, and the ceremony was performed by the Archbishop of Armagh (Primate of All Ireland). They had one son, who succeeded his father as Earl.

Late in Lord Wicklow's life he remarried, in 1942, to Lady Beatrix Herbert, daughter of Sidney Herbert, 14th Earl of Pembroke and Lady Beatrix Louisa Lambton.

References

External links
 

1877 births
1946 deaths
Members of the 1922 Seanad
Members of the 1925 Seanad
Irish representative peers
Irish unionists
Members of the Senate of Southern Ireland
Ralph
Independent members of Seanad Éireann
7